Trevor Ntando Nyakane (born 4 May 1989) is a South African professional rugby union player who currently plays for Racing 92 in the French Top14, and also the South Africa national rugby team, His regular playing position is prop and he has the ability to play at both loosehead and tighthead.

School career

Nyakane attended school in Limpopo top rugby school Ben Vorster where he played for the first team for two years. He was chosen to represent Limpopo at the Grant Khomo, and Craven Weeks tournaments in 2006 and 2007.

Career

Nyakane currently represents Racing 92. He has amassed more than 50 senior appearances in all senior competitions.

He attended his primary school in laerskool Gravelotte in Limpopo.

International

Nyakane was first named in the Springbok squad ahead of the 2013 mid-year rugby union tests.

On 22 June 2013 he scored his first test try, against , in Pretoria. With South Africa already leading 49-23, Nyakane's 80th minute score completed a comprehensive victory.

Nyakane was named in South Africa's squad for the 2019 Rugby World Cup. However he had to withdraw through injury in the pool stage and was replaced by Thomas du Toit. South Africa went on to win the tournament, defeating England in the final.

Nyakane started at tighthead prop for the opening test of the 2021 British & Irish Lions tour to South Africa. Injury to Ox Nché in that first test led Nyakane to switch roles to become the replacement loosehead prop for the subsequent two tests of the series. Despite not having played at loosehead prop for the Springboks since 2016, Nyakane's scrummaging earned the Springboks a number of crucial scrum penalties in the later half of the remaining games which saw the South Africans winning the series.

Honours
 Currie Cup winner 2020–21

Springbok statistics

Test Match Record 

Pld = Games Played, W = Games Won, D = Games Drawn, L = Games Lost, Tri = Tries Scored, Pts = Points Scored

International Tries

References

External links
 
 

1989 births
Living people
People from Bushbuckridge
Tsonga people
South African rugby union players
South Africa international rugby union players
Rugby union props
Cheetahs (rugby union) players
Free State Cheetahs players
Griffons (rugby union) players
Bulls (rugby union) players
Blue Bulls players
Racing 92 players
Rugby union players from Mpumalanga